Ellen Elizabeth King (16 January 1909 – 3 February 1994) was a Scottish competitive swimmer who represented Great Britain twice in the Olympics, and Scotland at the inaugural British Empire Games. King was a versatile swimmer, and competed in various backstroke, breaststroke, freestyle swimming events.

As a 15-year-old at the 1924 Summer Olympics in Paris, although ill, she competed in the semi-finals of the 100-metre backstroke and finished with the seventh best time overall. At 15, she was the youngest member of the British team.

Four years later at the 1928 Summer Olympics in Amsterdam, King won two silver medals.  She won the first medal as a member of the British women's team in the 4×100-metre freestyle relay, together with her teammates Joyce Cooper, Cissie Stewart and Iris Tanner, coming second behind the American women. In individual competition, she won her second silver in the 100-metre backstroke, finishing second behind Dutch swimmer Marie Braun and ahead of British teammate Joyce Cooper. King had set a new world record in her semi-final heat, only to have it broken by Braun in her own qualifying heat.

In the late 1920s King set the world records in the 150-yard and 220-yard breaststroke.

At the inaugural 1930 British Empire Games in Hamilton, Ontario, Canada, she won a silver medal in the 100-yard freestyle and a bronze medal in the 200-yard breaststroke. As a member of the Scottish relay team with Jean McDowell, Cissie Stewart, and Jessie McVey, she won her second bronze medal in the 4×100-yard freestyle competition. On the journey to Canada, on board ship, she maintained her fitness by using a punchball.

Ellen King attended James Gillespie's High School, swam for the Warrender Baths Club in Scotland and was a swimming teacher at Edinburgh schools for 40 years until her retirement in 1974. In 1928, she established the Zenith Ladies Amateur Swimming Club in response to the constraints imposed on her by male administrators who did not provide her or other female swimmers in the club enough opportunities to compete. In 2002, she was inducted into the Scottish Sports Hall of Fame.

See also
 List of Olympic medalists in swimming (women)

References

External links
 

1909 births
1994 deaths
People from Renfrew
Commonwealth Games silver medallists for Scotland
Commonwealth Games bronze medallists for Scotland
European Aquatics Championships medalists in swimming
Female backstroke swimmers
Scottish female freestyle swimmers
Olympic silver medallists for Great Britain
Olympic swimmers of Great Britain
Scottish female swimmers
Scottish Olympic medallists
Swimmers at the 1924 Summer Olympics
Swimmers at the 1928 Summer Olympics
Swimmers at the 1930 British Empire Games
Medalists at the 1928 Summer Olympics
Olympic silver medalists in swimming
Commonwealth Games medallists in swimming
Medallists at the 1930 British Empire Games